The Bucks were a band who played music based largely on Irish folk, touring briefly and recording and releasing one album for WEA Records in 1994.  While remaining obscure, the band was formed by well-known Irish musicians Ron Kavana and Terry Woods (of The Pogues, Sweeney's Men and Steeleye Span). Paddy Keenan played pipes.  James McNally (Storm, Pogues, Afro-Celt Sound System) was also a member, as were several members of Kavana's primary group, The Alias Band (Miriam Kavana, Fran Byrne).

Despite positive reviews of both the album and the live shows, the band broke up after failing to attract enough attention.  Kavana lays the blame on WEA for not promoting the album or band.  He also maintains he “never got a penny” for the album.

Discography

Dancin' To The Ceili Band (album)

Released in 1994 Warner Music – WEA
Dancin' To The Ceili Band (R. Kavana/T. Woods) – 3:23
Gra Geal Mo Chroi (R. Kavana/T. Woods) – 4:47
Rashers 'n' Eggs (R. Kavana/F.Byrne/T. Woods) – 3:25
The Ghost Of Winters Gone (R. Kavana/T. Woods) – 4:34
Auld Time Waltzes (Trad. arr. R. Kavana/M. Kavana/F. Byrne/T. Woods) – 4:51
Courtin' In The Kitchen (Trad. arr. R. Kavana/M.Kavana/T. Woods) – 4:27
What A Time (R. Kavana/R. Demick/T. Woods) – 2:56
An Puc Ar Buille (Trad. Arr & Translated R. Kavana/T. Woods) – 3:02
Hurray Me Boys, Hurray (R. Kavana/T. Woods) – 3:38
Psycho Ceili In Claremorris (R. Kavana/T. Woods) – 3:52
The Bucks Set (Trad. arr. R. Kavana/M. Kavana/F. Byrne/P. Keenan/T. Woods) – 5:46

Personnel
Terry Woods – Vocals, Mandolin, Concertina
Ron Kavana – Vocals, Bouzouki, Mandolin, Guitar & Percussion
Miriam Kavana – Fiddle, Harmony vocals
James McNally – Piano Accordion, Whistles, Bodhran, Backing Vocals
Paddy Keenan – Uilleann pipes
Rod Demick – Fender Bass, Backing Vocals
Fran Byrne – Drums, Button Accordion, Backing Vocals
Mick MacAulay – Button Accordion

With Guests
Olly Blanchflower – String Bass (Tracks 2, 10)
Chopper – Cello (Tracks 2, 10)
Thomas Lynch – Uilleann pipes (Track 5)
Tim Russell – Backing vocals (Track 3)
Duncan Cowell – Car Crash (Track 10)
Recorded at Alias & Marcus Studios, London, March 1994.
Produced by Ron Kavana & Terry Woods.

"Dancin' To The Ceili Band" (single)
Warner Music – WEA 1994 WMCD 16
"Dancing To The Ceili Band"  (R. Kavana/T. Woods) – 3:25
"The Ghost Of Winters Gone" (Alternative Mix)  (R. Kavana/T. Woods) – 4:12
"Dancing To The Ceilie Band" (Alternative Mix)  (R. Kavana/T. Woods) – 3:34

References

External links

Irish folk musical groups